Pelastoneurus is a genus of flies in the family Dolichopodidae.

Species

Unrecognised species:
Pelastoneurus contingens (Walker, 1852)
Pelastoneurus hebes (Walker, 1852)
Pelastoneurus heteroneurus (Macquart, 1850)
Pelastoneurus ineptus (Walker, 1852)
Pelastoneurus irrasus (Walker, 1849)
Pelastoneurus maculipes (Walker, 1852)
Pelastoneurus pilosicornis (Walker, 1849)
Pelastoneurus torquatus (Bigot, 1890)

Synonyms:
Pelastoneurus punctipennis (Say, 1829): moved to Stenopygium
Pelastoneurus variegatus Aldrich, 1901: Synonym of Stenopygium punctipennis (Say, 1829)

References

Dolichopodidae genera
Dolichopodinae
Diptera of North America
Taxa named by Hermann Loew